Damian Hill (~19762018) was an Australian film and television actor, and screenwriter.

He was the writer of and an actor in Pawno for which he received two 2016 AACTA Award nominations, Best Actor in a Leading Role and Best Original Screenplay. He was also nominated for Best Actor in 2018 for West of Sunshine.

Death and legacy
Hill died on 22 September 2018.

The Damian Hill Independent Film was awarded at the 2019 Melbourne International Film Festival in his honour.

The 2020 film Measure for Measure, which Hill contributed to writing, was dedicated to him.

Personal life
His brother is Australian politician Julian Hill, who is the current Member of Parliament for Bruce.

Filmography
TV
Nowhere Boys (2016) TV series - Stuart (3 episodes)
Neighbours (2014) TV series - Stephen Montague (6 episodes)
Winners & Losers (2014) TV series - Ant Richards (1 episode)
The Broken Shore (2013) TV movie - Vincent
Rush (2010) TV series - Dane Heinz (1 episode)
City Homicide (2010) TV series - Dale Blunt (1 episode)
McLeod's Daughters (2003) TV series - Mounted Police Officer (1 episode)
Film
Locusts (2019) - Davo
Slam (2018) - Shane
West of Sunshine (2018) - Michelle Anderson
The Menkoff Method (2016) - Karaoke Operator
Spin Out (2016) - Spike
The Death and Life of Otto Bloom (2016) - Bob
Broke (2016) - Lionel
Pawno (2015) - Danny Williams
Fell (2014) - Kelly
Model Behaviour (2013) - Roy Lambasto

References

External links
 

Australian male film actors
Australian male television actors
1976 births
2018 deaths
Male actors from Melbourne
People educated at Wesley College (Victoria)